Ascoidea may refer to:

Ascoidea (fungus), a genus of fungi in the family Ascoideaceae
Ascoidea (mite), a superfamily of mites in the order Mesostigmata